Western New Mexico University is a public university in Silver City, New Mexico. It was founded in 1893.

History

Founded in the Territory of New Mexico on February 11, 1893 as the New Mexico Normal School, the school began to offer classes on September 3, 1894, in a rented Presbyterian church. On June 2, 1893, the nascent board of regents accepted  of Town of Silver City land situated on a hillside overlooking the town donated by Regent, and Mayor Town of Silver City, Colonel John W. Fleming. In November 1896, the school's first permanent building, Old Main, was dedicated, and within twenty years enrollment had reached nearly 500 students.

Academics
WNMU offers more than 70 areas of study. Twelve master's degrees, 41 bachelor's degrees, and 20 associate degrees and certificate programs are available. Fields of study include accounting, business, chemistry, criminal justice, education, environmental sustainability, forest/wildlife, graphic design, history, nursing, occupational therapy, psychology, social work, sociology, and zoology.

In fall of 2015, enrollment was over 3,500 students. The student-to-faculty ratio is 18:1.

In addition to its Silver City location, WNMU's Gallup Graduate Studies Center serves the diverse needs of northwestern New Mexico and northeastern Arizona. Located in Gallup, New Mexico, the graduate studies center offers Master of Arts programs in counseling and educational leadership, as well as Master of Arts in Teaching programs in elementary, secondary and special education. Courses leading to teaching endorsements in bilingual education and TESOL, as well as New Mexico Alternative Teaching Licensure in elementary, secondary and special education are also available.

Well known for its award-winning Schools of Education, Social Work, and Nursing, other areas of interest include criminal justice, business management, outdoor leadership, natural sciences, and interdisciplinary studies.

WNMU also supports learning centers in Deming, Truth or Consequences, and Lordsburg, New Mexico.

More than 150 courses are offered online. Online degrees include the Master of Arts in interdisciplinary studies, Bachelor of Social Work, Master of Social Work, Master of Business Administration, and bachelor's degrees in criminal justice, nursing and rehabilitation services.

The university has received numerous awards for excellence. In 2003 WNMU was the first 4-year university in the state to be recognized by Quality New Mexico with its highest honor, the Zia Award. The Best Practice Award was received by WNMU's School of Education in 2005. In 2006 the Silver City Chamber of Commerce awarded WNMU its Large Business of the Year Award. Two years later, WNMU received the 2008 Pinon Recognition, and the 2008 Companero Award. In 2009, the Department of Institutional Advancement received the Pinon Recognition from Quality New Mexico.

Western New Mexico University is accredited by the Higher Learning Commission.

Athletics

Athletics teams are nicknamed the Mustangs and compete in several sports such as football, volleyball, tennis, softball, basketball, cross country, and golf.

Western New Mexico is a member of the NCAA Division II Lone Star Conference, which they joined during the 2016–17 school year. Prior to joining the Lone Star Conference, Western New Mexico competed as a member of the Rocky Mountain Athletic Conference (RMAC) from 1967 to 1990, and then from 2006 to 2016. Prior re-joining the RMAC, WNMU also competed as an NCAA D-II Independent from 1990 to 1998, and the Pacific West Conference from 1998 to 2005, and later the Heartland Conference during the 2005–06 school year.

Child Development Center
WNMU's on campus Child Development Center is nationally recognized and accredited. The 5 Star program is a learning lab for students earning degrees in early childhood education.

Campus life
The WNMU campus is a hybrid of registered historic buildings and modern facilities with LEED certifications. The 80-acre campus includes over 40 buildings with four residence halls, a nearly 1000 seat Fine Arts Center Theater, swimming pool and football field. Students have access to a fitness center and a campus movie theater. A long-held tradition, The Great Race, was created in 1967 and is celebrated each spring. Students form teams and compete against each other in several go cart races for one week. Each fall, as a rite of passage, new students climb W Mountain and paint the W during the first week of the new school year.

University museum
Housed in Fleming Hall, the WNMU Museum is home to the largest permanent collection of Mimbres pottery in the world. The WNMU Museum is the foremost center for the viewing and research of the Mimbres culture.

WNMU satellite campuses
Deming
Gallup Temporarily disabled for budgetary reasons
Lordsburg Temporarily disabled for budgetary reasons

Notable alumni
Vernon Asbill, educator and former member of the New Mexico Senate
Richard Angulo, former WNMU Mustang football player (1998–2002), was a tight-end with the NFL teams the Jacksonville Jaguars and the Chicago Bears.
Kenneth Wayne Brewer, American poet, longtime scholar, and former poet laureate of Utah.
Howie Morales, lieutenant governor of New Mexico and former state senator; earned a Master of Arts degree in bilingual education in 1998.
Carleton Naiche-Palmer, former president of the Mescalero Apache (2008–2010). Earned a BBA degree in 1974.
 Tammie Jo Shults, former United States Navy F/A-18 naval aviator and captain of Southwest Airlines Flight 1380 
Jerry D. Thompson, historian of the American Southwest, received his Bachelor of Arts degree in history from WNMU.

References

External links

Western New Mexico Athletics website

 
Educational institutions established in 1893
Buildings and structures in Grant County, New Mexico
Education in Grant County, New Mexico
Education in Luna County, New Mexico
1893 establishments in New Mexico Territory
Public universities and colleges in New Mexico